The 1988 World Women's Curling Championship was held in Glasgow, Scotland from 2–10 April 1988.

West Germany, skipped by Andrea Schöpp defeated Canada in the final to claim Germany's first ever women's world championship in curling.

Teams

Round robin standings

Round robin results

Draw 1

Draw 2

Draw 3

Draw 4

Draw 5

Draw 6

Draw 7

Draw 8

Draw 9

Playoffs

Semifinals

Bronze-medal game

Gold-medal game

References
General

Specific

World Women's Curling Championship
Ford World Women's Curling Championship
1988 in Scottish sport
Women's curling competitions in Scotland
International sports competitions in Glasgow
April 1988 sports events in the United Kingdom
1988 in Scottish women's sport
1980s in Glasgow
International curling competitions hosted by Scotland